The Roamer Handicap was an American Thoroughbred horse race held at Aqueduct Racetrack in Queens, New York. It was open to three-year-old horses of either sex and contested on dirt over a distance of 9.5 furlongs (1 3/16 miles / 1,900 metres). Run forty-three times, the first ten editions were held between 1944 and 1958 at Jamaica Race Course in Jamaica, Queens, New York.

Historical notes
The inaugural running took place on April 11, 1944 and was run at a distance of 1 1/16 miles for the only time in its history. The race would see Lillian Christopher's Grey Wing defeat Stymie, a future U.S. Racing Hall of Fame inductee owned by Ethel Jacobs.

The filly Bridal Flower not only "beat the boys" in winning the 1946 Roamer Handicap, she beat the reigning U.S. Triple Crown Champion Assault.

The 1952 running saw Canadian jockey Hedley Woodhouse aboard 10-1 Quiet Step upset future Hall of Fame inductee Tom Fool who was also ridden by a Canadian, Ted Atkinson.

In 1960, Elizabeth Lunn's Divine Comedy won the race by 8 lengths and set a new Aqueduct track record with a time of 1:55 4/5. Seven years later, 1967 Kentucky Derby winner Proud Clarion broke that record by 4/5 of a second with a time of 1:55 flat.

Sherluck's win in  the 1961 Roamer Handicap followed an earlier victory in the Belmont Stakes that ended Carry Back's chance to win the U.S. Triple Crown.

Forego won the 1973 edition of the Roamer Handicap in stakes record time while carrying highweight. He beat runner-up My Gallant by five lengths with Twice A Prince in third another 2½ lengths back. The Roamer Handicap marked Forego's first stakes race win of what would become a career ranked among the best in U.S racing history. Owned by Martha Gerry, Forego earned eight Eclipse Awards, including three American Horse of the Year titles, and would be inducted into the  U.S Racing Hall of Fame.

The final running took place on December 26, 1986 and was won by Betty M. Peters' Scrimshaw.

Records
Speed record:
 1:54.60 @ 1 – Forego (1973)

Most wins by a jockey:
 4 – Ángel Cordero Jr. (1968, 1974, 1981, 1984)

Most wins by a trainer:
 2 – Kay Erik Jensen (1952, 1958)
 2 – Laz Barrera (1971, 1974)

Most wins by an owner:
 2 – Darby Dan Farm (1967, 1972)

Winners

References

Discontinued horse races in New York City
Open middle distance horse races
Aqueduct Racetrack
Jamaica Race Course
Flat horse races for three-year-olds
Graded stakes races in the United States
1944 establishments in New York City
1987 disestablishments in New York (state)
Recurring sporting events established in 1944
Recurring sporting events disestablished in 1987